Jay Rhodemyre (June 29, 1923 – June 7, 1968) was a former center in the National Football League. He was drafted by the Green Bay Packers in the seventh round of the 1948 NFL Draft and would play four seasons with the team.

Rhodemyer attended the University of Kentucky where he was elected to the 1948 College Football All Star Team.  He was a member of Phi Sigma Kappa fraternity.

References

1922 births
1968 deaths
Sportspeople from Ashland, Kentucky
Players of American football from Kentucky
American football centers
Kentucky Wildcats football players
Green Bay Packers players